Vengurla taluka is a taluka in Sindhudurg district of Maharashtra; an Indian state.

References

Talukas in Sindhudurg district
Talukas in Maharashtra